Kvitegga is a mountain on the border between the municipalities of Stranda and Volda in Møre og Romsdal county, Norway.

Kvitegga is the highest mountain in the Sunnmørsalpene mountain range. It offers a very wide view, from Galdhøpiggen in the southeast (just jutting above the Sikilbreen glacier), to the impressing Hurrungane mountains further to the southeast, as well as all the local alpine surroundings and a wide swath of the ocean in the west.

See also
List of peaks in Norway by prominence (Kvitegga is number 10)
List of mountains of Norway

References

Mountains of Møre og Romsdal
Volda